WIBL (107.7 FM), known as "The Bull", is a commercial radio station in Central Illinois with a country music radio format. WIBL is licensed to Fairbury, Illinois, and serves the Bloomington-Normal radio market.  It is owned by Pilot Media, which is a subsidiary of Great Plains Media.  Great Plains' CEO is Jerry Zimmer, a longtime partner in the Zimmer Radio Group based in Cape Girardeau, Missouri.  WIBL features "20 Songs in A Row" music sweeps at various times each day, resulting in approximately 70 minutes of music without commercials.

WIBL has an effective radiated power (ERP) of 14,000 watts, broadcasting from a transmitter on South Pine Street in Lexington, Illinois.  For a clearer signal in Bloomington-Normal, a 250-watt FM translator, W221CY, also broadcasts WIBL programming at 92.1 MHz in Normal.

History
It was known as WBZM, 107.7 The Buzz. WBZM was owned by Crowmwell Broadcasting, and was operated out of the company's Peoria cluster. It had an Alternative Rock format, with the syndicated "Bob and Tom Show" in the morning. The disc jockeys were all the same as on 99X, which was, at the time, WIXO on its original Bartonville frequency of 99.9.

When Cromwell sold the Peoria cluster in 2001, WBZM was not included in the sale.  Operations were moved to Cromwell's Decatur cluster and WBZM quickly went on the sale block.  At the end of 2001, AAA Entertainment purchased the signal and began simulcasting 96.7 WIHN Normal, then later 99.5 WDQZ Lexington.

On March 28, 2003, AAA debuted WYST, an AC station branded as "Star 107.7".  In June 2003 the station's signal was upgraded and moved from Fairbury to Lexington, Illinois.

In February 2007, the format was modified to R&B/Soul with the slogan "The Heart and Soul of the Twin Cities", which had more of a rhythmic lean than competitor 100.7 WVMG.

In April 2007 the station began a local marketing agreement (LMA) with Great Plains Media.  No immediate format change was made.

On June 29, 2007, at Noon, just several days after the closing the sale on WYST, Great Plains Media flipped the format to Country as "107.7 The Bull."  The station is the first to take on heritage WBWN in the Bloomington market.  On August 17, 2010, WYST changed its call letters to WIBL to go with the "Bull" branding.

References

External links
WIBL The Bull's official website

Radio Locator Link for W221CY

IBL
Radio stations established in 2002
2002 establishments in Illinois